Vitasta School of Law and Humanities or VSLH is a private law school situated beside Nowgam bye pass, Pohru Crossing at Srinagar in the Indian union territory of Jammu and Kashmir. It is one of the premier law institute of the state. It offers undergraduate 3 years law courses, 5 Year Integrated B.A. LL.B. courses is approved by Bar Council of India (BCI), New Delhi and affiliated to University of Kashmir. Vitasta School of Law and Humanities was established in 2010.

References

Educational institutions established in 2010
2010 establishments in Jammu and Kashmir
Education in Srinagar
University of Kashmir
Law schools in Jammu and Kashmir